WEC 41: Brown vs. Faber 2 was a mixed martial arts event held by World Extreme Cagefighting on June 7, 2009 at the Arco Arena in Sacramento, California. It was the most successful show in the WEC's history.

Background
Featherweight champion Mike Brown defended his title in a rematch against former champion and no. 1 contender Urijah Faber in the main event. 

Eddie Wineland was expected to face Frank Gomez at the event, but was forced off the card with an injury and replaced by WEC newcomer Noah Thomas.

Richard Crunkilton was expected to face Donald Cerrone at this event, but was forced out of the bout with an injury and replaced by James Krause.

Charlie Valencia was originally slated to face WEC newcomer Kyle Dietz at this event, but withdrew from the bout due to injury and was replaced by Rafael Rebello.

The event drew an estimated 1,300,000 viewers on Versus.  UFC lightweight Kenny Florian acted as a special guest color commentator as Frank Mir was unavailable after his wife went into labor.

Results

Bonus Awards
Fighters were awarded $10,000 bonuses.

Fight of the Night:  Mike Brown vs.  Urijah Faber
Knockout of the Night:  José Aldo
Submission of the Night:  Seth Dikun

Payouts
The following is the reported payout to the fighters as reported to the California State Athletic Commission. It does not include sponsor money or "locker room" bonuses often given by the WEC and also do not include the WEC's traditional "fight night" bonuses.

Mike Brown: $26,000 (includes $13,000 win bonus) def. Urijah Faber: $26,000
José Aldo: $22,000 ($11,000 win bonus) def. Cub Swanson: $9,000
Donald Cerrone: $18,000 ($9,000 win bonus) def. James Krause: $2,000
Josh Grispi: $18,000 ($9,000 win bonus) def. Jens Pulver: $33,000
Manny Gamburyan: $28,000 ($14,000 win bonus) def. John Franchi: $4,000
Rafael Rebello: $4,000 ($2,000 win bonus) def. Kyle Dietz: $2,000
Anthony Pettis: $4,000 ($2,000 win bonus) def. Mike Campbell: $4,000
Antonio Banuelos: $10,000 ($5,000 win bonus) def. Scott Jorgensen: $6,000
Frank Gomez: $4,000 ($2,000 win bonus) def. Noah Thomas: $3,000
Seth Dikun: $4,000 ($2,000 win bonus) def. Rolando Perez: $3,000

See also
 World Extreme Cagefighting
 List of World Extreme Cagefighting champions
 List of WEC events
 2009 in WEC

External links
Official WEC website

References

World Extreme Cagefighting events
Events in Sacramento, California
2009 in mixed martial arts
Mixed martial arts in Sacramento, California
Sports competitions in Sacramento, California
2009 in sports in California